Strobo is the debut studio album by Japanese musician Vaundy, released on May 27, 2020 through Stardust Promotion's label SDR. The album was preceded by many singles, including "Bye by Me" and "Tokyo Flash".

Release 
The album was released on May 27, 2020. It contains several of Vaundy's early independently released songs, such as "Tokyo Flash", and new songs like "Tomoshibi", the latter of which was used as the theme song to the 2020 drama adaptation of Tokyo Love Story. Several songs, including "Life Hack" and "Tokyo Flash" received music videos. "Kaiju no Hanauta" was the album's most successful song, peaking at second on the Billboard Japan Hot 100.

Track listing

Charts

References 

2020 debut albums
Japanese-language albums